The French Office in Taipei represents France's interests in Taiwan in the absence of formal diplomatic relations, functioning as a de facto embassy. Its counterpart in France is the Taipei Representative Office in France, based in Paris.

History
The Office was established in 1981 as the French Institute, before being renamed the French Office in Taipei. It adopted its present name in 2011, although its Chinese language name has remained unchanged. On 23 February 2021, the new office of the French Office in Taipei re-opened after its relocation to 39th floor, Taipei 101.

List of directors

References

External links
  

1981 establishments in Taiwan
France
Taiwan
France–Taiwan relations
Organizations established in 1981